Andries van Aarde (born 1951) is an honorary professor of theology and a research fellow at the University of Pretoria. He is also an ordained minister in the Netherdutch Reformed Church of Africa. He has shown interest in the Historical Jesus debate.

Notes

Living people
1951 births
South African Calvinist and Reformed theologians
Academic staff of the University of Pretoria
South African biblical scholars
Religion academics
Historians of antiquity
20th-century Calvinist and Reformed theologians

Members of the Jesus Seminar